Sulfur dioxygenase (sulfur oxygenase, sulfur:oxygen oxidoreductase) is an enzyme with systematic name S-sulfanylglutathione:oxygen oxidoreductase. This enzyme catalyses the following chemical reaction

 sulfur + O2 + H2O  sulfite + 2 H+ (overall reaction)
 (1a) glutathione + sulfur  S-sulfanylglutathione (spontaneous reaction)
 (1b) S-sulfanylglutathione + O2 + H2O  glutathione + sulfite + 2 H+

This enzyme contains iron.

In humans, sulfur dioxygenase is needed to detoxify sulfide.

References

External links 
 

EC 1.13.11